Marcuse "Cusie" Pfeifer (November 4, 1936 – July 17, 2020) was an American gallerist. Pfeifer was an important person in recognition of photography as a fine art, founding member and art exhibition director of the Hudson Valley LGBTQ Community Center in Kingston, New York, and a supporter of the Samuel Dorsky Museum of Art. She opened the Marcuse Pfeifer Gallery on Madison Avenue in 1976, and later moved to 568 Broadway. She helped people, including Sally Mann, Peter Hujar, and Timothy Greenfield-Sanders to launch their careers as contemporary photographers. In 1978, she curated a show of male nudes, with work by Robert Maplethorpe, Lynn Davis and Peter Hujar, prompting The New York Times reviewer to call for a return to "old-fashioned prudery".

Pfeifer died on July 17, 2020, at age 83.

References

Art museum people
American curators
1936 births
2020 deaths
People from Little Rock, Arkansas
Place of death missing
American women curators
21st-century American women